Aural is an adjective: of or pertaining to the ear or sound.

Aural may also refer to:

 Phnom Aural, a mountain in Cambodia
 Laura Sippola (born 1974), Finnish musician also known as AURAL

See also 
 Oral (disambiguation)